

A manger or trough is a rack for fodder, or a structure or feeder used to hold food for animals. The word comes from the Old French mangier (meaning "to eat"), from Latin mandere (meaning "to chew").

Mangers are mostly used in livestock raising and generally found at stables and farmhouses. They are also used to feed wild animals, e.g., in nature reserves. 

A similar trough providing drinking water for domestic or non-domestic animals is a watering trough and may be part of a larger watering structure called abreuvoir.

The manger in Christianity 
The manger is associated with nativity scenes where Mary and Joseph, forced by necessity to stay in a room for animals instead of a guest room, used a manger as a makeshift crib for the Baby Jesus. ( phatnē; Luke 2:7).

Gallery

See also
Away in a Manger, a Christmas carol
 Bird feeder
The Dog in the Manger, a metaphor

References

External links

Livestock
Christian symbols